Dafni-Ymittos is a municipality in the Central Athens regional unit, Attica, Greece. The seat of the municipality is the town Dafni. The municipality has an area of 2.350 km2.

Municipality
The municipality Dafni–Ymittos was formed at the 2011 local government reform by the merger of the following 2 former municipalities, that became municipal units:
Dafni
Ymittos

References

Municipalities of Attica
Populated places in Central Athens (regional unit)